Bah, Humduck! A Looney Tunes Christmas (also known as Looney Tunes: Bah Humduck) is a 2006 animated direct-to-DVD Christmas comedy film starring the Looney Tunes characters, directed by Charles Visser, produced by Warner Bros. Animation and animated overseas by Toon City Animation. The film is based on the Charles Dickens 1843 novella A Christmas Carol. The special was released on DVD on November 14, 2006, and was then broadcast on Cartoon Network in December 2006.  The special was rereleased on DVD as part of the Looney Tunes Holiday Triple Feature on September 1, 2020.

Plot
As the film's title implies, Daffy Duck stars in an Ebenezer Scrooge-like role in the Looney Tunes retelling of this classic tale.

In the beginning of the movie, Bugs Bunny (in a Fred-like role) pops up out of his hole to clear away the snow and explains to the audience he's all about winter holidays, despite the fact that rabbits are traditionally associated with Easter. He's then almost run over by Daffy Duck's gas-guzzling SUV. Daffy is the owner of the Lucky Duck Superstore (a Costco-esque megastore). True to his Scrooge-like role, he treats his employees (played by other Looney Tunes characters) like they're garbage. Despite Bugs scolding him for his treatment of Playboy Penguin, Daffy still acts in a snobbish manner and tries to abscond with the money Priscilla Pig, Egghead Jr., Henery Hawk, and Barnyard Dawg Jr. are collecting for charity. Daffy especially has trouble with his hover scooter and gets beat up by his own employees (through no fault of their own) and the customers (since he insulted them too). After Daffy states he hates the holidays, Bugs warns him about the Ghosts of Christmas at which Daffy simply scoffs.

After working his employees to the bone on Christmas Eve, Daffy expects them all back at 5:00 AM on Christmas Day so he can make more money off of last minute shoppers. Assistant Manager Porky Pig (in a Bob Cratchit-like role) pleads with Daffy to let him go home for Christmas and spend time with his daughter Priscilla (in a Tiny Tim-like role), but Daffy refuses. Bugs warns him that bad things would happen to people like him (referring to A Christmas Carol) and tells him "Bah, Humduck!" (an adaption of Scrooge's "Bah, Humbug!"), which Daffy then takes as his own. 

Later that day, the spirit of Daffy's deceased business idol Sylvester the Investor (Sylvester the Cat in a Jacob Marley-like role) appears before Daffy where he is clad in chains as punishment for his greed after a disgruntled employee ran over him nine times in a forklift. Sylvester warns Daffy that if he doesn't change his ways, he will be doomed to the same fate. He also tells Daffy that he still has a chance of escaping his fate and foretells that three ghosts will visit him. Thinking of this as a trick by Bugs after Sylvester disappears, Daffy does not believe what Sylvester said to him. After the visit, Daffy turns down the requests of Elmer Fudd (who would like some vacation time), Marvin the Martian (who would like to go home to Mars), and Porky Pig (who wants to go home and spend time with Priscilla and that doll that Priscilla wanted Porky tried to buy since Daffy tripled the prices from the store). At the end of the day, everyone goes home for the night. Later that night, Daffy ends up trapped in the store by a snowdrift with Bugs. He locks himself in his vault to be safe. But the ghosts are not that easily stopped. 

The Ghosts of Christmas Past (portrayed by Granny and Tweety) appears, then takes Daffy back to his childhood, where they see that Daffy lived at the Lucky Duck Orphanage (with his design from Baby Looney Tunes reused) and every Christmas, he was ignored by potential parents, which explains his unhappy demeanor in the Present Day (and how his store got its name). The Ghost of Christmas Present (portrayed by Yosemite Sam) then appears and berates Daffy for his treatment of his employees telling him if he doesn't change his ways, his future is very bleak. He shows him what Elmer Fudd, Marvin the Martian, and Porky Pig are doing at the time. By this time, Daffy is starting to feel tender emotion (though he doesn't attribute it as guilt) which earns him another one of the Ghost's numerous beatings. By this time, he actually dreads the visit of the last ghost and pleads with Bugs to hide him from it. After a reenactment of Bugs and Daffy's hiding routine, Daffy is left alone at the mercy of the ghost.

The Ghost of Christmas Future (portrayed by the Tasmanian Devil) eventually appears. He takes Daffy to the future showing that because of his greed and selfishness, he has died from an unknown cause. At Daffy's headstone, Porky Pig tells Priscilla about the loss of Daffy. He tells her that because Daffy tried to name himself as his own heir which is illegal, the Lucky Duck Superstore closed down, leaving everyone out of a job. Though it did allow them to spend Christmas with their families just like they wanted. After Porky leaves the grave, Priscilla stays longer and reveals that she never hated Daffy. Like him, Priscilla can understand what it's like not having family around at the holidays and feeling that no one should be alone at this time of year, she promises to come visit his grave every year on Christmas. Priscilla leaves a plate of Christmas cookies on Daffy's grave before following her dad out of the cemetery. Because of Priscilla's kindness, Daffy's cold demeanor melts and his heart breaks. Realizing his greed and selfish nature was to cover up his real wish to be part of a family, Daffy vows to be a kinder and more generous person as the Ghost of Christmas Yet to Come sends him on his way.

Returning to the present, he starts to make reparations by waking up a nearby Elmer where he enlists his help in exchange for accepting his request of vacation time. He promotes Porky to the store manager, gives Marvin a rocket to go home to Mars, hires Playboy Penguin as his new employee, gives all of his employees the gifts they desired, along with a raise and a paid vacation. There's a brief moment when he slides back to his greedy self while contemplating just how he is going to recover all the costs. However, it immediately fades when Priscilla presents a plate of duck-shaped cookies and calls him "Uncle Daffy". Daffy thinks she's pushing it until she kisses him on the cheek and he lets her call him "Uncle Daffy" (implying that he finally got his wish to be part of a family). All of this is witnessed by the Ghosts of Christmas.

As the film reaches its end, Bugs comments on how he loves the holidays (chomping on a candy cane afterwards), the camera pulls out of the mall to end the movie. Porky and Priscilla finish the movie by saying Porky's famous line: "T-T-T-That's all folks!"

Characters
 Bugs Bunny - Himself, Narrator, also a Lucky Duck customer; serves as a Fred-type foil to Daffy.
 Daffy Duck - Owner of Lucky Duck Superstore, he despises families and Christmas because he was continuously rejected by potential adopters, which basically explains his greed and love for money. He would stop despising families when he finally gets his wish to be a part of a family by allowing Priscilla to call him uncle. He is based on Ebenezer Scrooge. 
 Porky Pig - Assistant Manager of Lucky Duck Superstore; based on Bob Cratchit.
 Egghead Jr., Henery Hawk, Barnyard Dawg Jr. - Carolers
 Pepé Le Pew, Speedy Gonzales, Marvin the Martian, Elmer Fudd, Wile E. Coyote, Road Runner, Foghorn Leghorn, The Three Bears, Sam Sheepdog, Claude Cat, Charlie Dog, Miss Prissy, Barnyard Dawg, Mac, Tosh, Hippety Hopper, Beaky Buzzard, Hubie and Bertie - Lucky Duck employees
 Pete Puma - Lucky Duck janitor, reprising this occupation from Tiny Toon Adventures
 Gossamer - Lucky Duck security guard
 Penelope Pussycat - Lucky Duck customer; as with her original role, she is also Pepé Le Pew's girlfriend.
 Sylvester the Cat - Ghost of "Sylvester the Investor". Based on Jacob Marley, Sylvester was Daffy's business idol, whose fate was predetermined because of his own greed. He warns Daffy that the same fate would befall on him unless he changes his ways, while also saying that three Ghosts of Christmas will visit him. The scene also reveals that his death was caused by a disgruntled employee, as opposed to the novel in which Marley died of more natural causes (such as old age). 
 Granny and Tweety Bird - Ghosts of Christmas Past who takes Daffy to his past to reveal how his greed and love for money surfaced.
 Yosemite Sam - Ghost of Christmas Present who beats up Daffy every time he gets insensitive for his employees' misery.
 Taz - Ghost of Christmas Yet to Come who is the only one who actually got through to Daffy when he shows him the consequences of his greed: his untimely death.
 Priscilla Pig - Kind and caring daughter of Porky; serves as a Tiny Tim-type foil to Daffy.
 Playboy Penguin - Beggar who lives near Lucky Duck Superstore; towards the end, he becomes a Lucky Duck employee.

Cast
 Joe Alaskey as Daffy Duck, Sylvester the Investor, Marvin the Martian, Pepé Le Pew and Foghorn Leghorn
 Bob Bergen as Porky Pig, the Ghost of Christmas Past and Speedy Gonzales
 Billy West as Bugs Bunny, Elmer J. Fudd 
 June Foray as the Ghost of Christmas Past
 Maurice LaMarche as the Ghost of Christmas Present
 Tara Strong as Priscilla Pig, House Wife
 Jim Cummings as the Ghost of Christmas Future, Security Guard
 Paul Julian as the Road Runner (archive recording; uncredited)

See also

 Adaptations of A Christmas Carol
 List of Christmas films
 Bugs Bunny's Christmas Carol
 Bugs Bunny's Looney Christmas Tales
 Tom and Jerry: A Nutcracker Tale, another animated Christmas film by Warner Bros. Animation featuring Tom and Jerry.

References

External links

 
 

2006 films
2006 comedy-drama films
2006 animated films
2006 direct-to-video films
2000s American animated films
2000s children's comedy films
2000s children's drama films
2000s children's animated films
2000s Christmas comedy-drama films
2000s English-language films
American children's animated comedy films
American children's animated drama films
American Christmas comedy-drama films
American direct-to-video films
Direct-to-video drama films
Animated Christmas films
Looney Tunes films
Films based on A Christmas Carol
Beaky Buzzard films
Bugs Bunny films
Daffy Duck films
Elmer Fudd films
Foghorn Leghorn films
Marvin the Martian films
Penelope Pussycat films
Pepé Le Pew films
Porky Pig films
Ralph Wolf and Sam Sheepdog films
Speedy Gonzales films
Sylvester the Cat films
Tasmanian Devil (Looney Tunes) films
Tweety films
Yosemite Sam films
Films set in shopping malls
Warner Bros. Animation animated films
Warner Bros. direct-to-video animated films